Luins Castle (also known as the Château de Luins) is a castle in the municipality of Luins of the Canton of Vaud in Switzerland.  It is a Swiss heritage site of national significance. It was purchased by James-Alexandre de Pourtalès in 1809.

See also
 List of castles in Switzerland
 Château

References

Cultural property of national significance in the canton of Vaud
Castles in Vaud